Westfield Fountain Gate is a super-regional shopping centre located in Narre Warren in the south-eastern suburbs of Melbourne, Australia.  It is the second largest shopping centre in Australia by floor area. However, it is the largest shopping centre in Australia with all 3 discount department stores, Big W, Target and Kmart.

History 

The Fountain Gate Shopping Centre was constructed and opened in March 1980 by the Overland Construction Corporation. The centre accommodated two major retailers, Kmart and Coles New World, as well as 51 other shops. In 1984, a Safeway supermarket was opened and then in 1988 the second floor of the shopping centre was built, accommodating a Forges department store (now Target), a Harry Heath’s Supermarket, a food court and 40 more specialty shops. In September 1988, the adjacent homemaker centre opened. 

The centre was later purchased by the Westfield Group in July 1995 and was redeveloped into a much larger complex, which was completed by 2001. This redevelopment included a new food court, a cinema, a relocated Safeway (later rebranded as Woolworths), a Big W department store and Aldi supermarket. The former Safeway, which was to the south of Kmart, was redeveloped into a new area featuring a Reject Shop, Harris Scarfe, Australian Post office and more stores.

A major expansion of the complex took place between 2011 and 2012. Approved by the City of Casey in December 2007, the extension featured a new two-level 12,000m2 Myer store, a new 4,200m2 Coles store, in a new location near the former BI-LO, with the existing store shell being reconfigured with space for two new minor anchor stores, as well as providing increased retail space for Target, which increased from 6,884m2 to 8,368m2. David Jones had been set to open a store in the new expansion but terminated the contract with Westfield in July 2010, with Myer replacing David Jones in the expansion. David Jones had been trying to exit its contract with Westfield Group since 2003 as Fountain Gate did not fit the company's strategy or target demographic. Four new minor anchor retail spaces were constructed, as well as 114 new specialty store spaces and 1,500 new car parking spaces, with new ground-level parking surrounding the centre and new rooftop parking above the new mall areas.

It is the location of the first-ever Krispy Kreme in Victoria.

A new building has been added to the complex which is the City of Casey's vibrant new entertainment precinct, it is the creative and community heart of the region. This is the new home of the Narre Warren Library.

In popular culture 
Fountain Gate Shopping Centre is named as the mall frequented by the characters in the popular television series Kath & Kim. Scenes in the show are filmed at Fountain Gate and at another Westfield complex, Westfield Southland.

Fountain Gate Shopping Centre was a filming location in the feature film Bad Eggs where, in the first scene, a car rolls into the actual shopping centre; in the film, the mall is named Crystal Heights Shop Kingdom.

Transport 
Narre Warren railway station is approximately 1 km away from the centre and is linked by a number of bus routes to Westfield Fountain Gate. Some regional buses also stop at Fountain Gate.

The Hallam Bypass, a new section of the Monash Freeway opened in 2003, passes beside the complex and can be viewed from the windows in the food court. A trail known as the Hallam Bypass Trail, constructed at the same time, runs beside the centre on the north-east side, providing access for cyclists and pedestrians.

See also
Westfield Group
Narre Warren
List of shopping centres in Australia by size

References

External links
 
 Westfield Fountain Gate website - Development update

Westfield Group
Shopping centres in Melbourne
Shopping malls established in 1970
1970 establishments in Australia
Buildings and structures in the City of Casey